John Dillard Bellamy Jr. (March 24, 1854 – September 25, 1942) was a Democratic U.S. Congressman from North Carolina between 1899 and 1903.

Born in Wilmington, North Carolina into one of the area's wealthiest families, Bellamy was a close friend of future President Woodrow Wilson as a young man.  Bellamy attended local common schools, the Cape Fear Military Academy, Davidson College, graduating in 1873, and finally the University of Virginia at Charlottesville, graduating in 1875. He was admitted to the bar in 1875 and practiced law in Wilmington, where he was city attorney from 1892 to 1894.

Due to the influence the Bellamy family had in Wilmington, Bellamy quickly rose to powerful positions in the city. In February 1889, Bellamy was elected to the Board of Directors of the Chamber of Industry and in March he was elected Vice President. Bellamy was also elected director to the Bellevue Cemetery Company, President of the Industrial Manufacturing Company, Chairman to the New Hanover County Democratic Executive Committee, Chairman to the Third Ward, and was a member of The Rightworthy Grand Lodge of the Independent Order of Odd Fellows of North Carolina representing Cape Fear Lodge No. 2; F.

Bellamy was on the County Democratic ticket for North Carolina Senate representing New Hanover and Pender Counties in 1891. Bellamy ran on a platform supporting the agricultural and laboring classes and equal rights and laws. During his time in the 1891 North Carolina State Senate Bellamy was on the Judiciary Committee, Education Committee, Salaries and Fees Committee, Penal Institutions Committee, Public Buildings and Grounds Committee, Military Affairs Committee, and was the Chairman of Corporations.

One of the bills that Bellamy supported in his time in the North Carolina State Senate was SB12, the founding of The Agricultural and Mechanical College for the Colored Race (known today as the North Carolina Agricultural and Technical State University). The North Carolina General Assembly was threatened with losing federal funding via the Morrill Acts if they did not found a higher education institute for Black North Carolinian's and shortly thereafter Bellamy introduced SB12. In Bellamy's 1942 autobiography, Memoirs of an Octogenarian, which he wrote during his last year of life, he boasted that, “many other bills...were passed” during his time in the General Assembly, but he only went into detail about his role in establishing A&T University explaining he “drafted the charter for the Negro Agricultural College at Greensboro.”  Bellamy never explicitly stated why he suddenly supported SB12; if he was taking it on because he truly believed in a need for a Black college or if he was simply supporting it to secure federal funding for other colleges, but it is most likely at the intersection of myriad reasons he chose to support SB12.

He was elected to the North Carolina Senate in 1900, amid the widespread voter fraud and intimidation tactics of the Wilmington Insurrection of 1898. Wilmington lawyer William Henderson was one of many targeted in the insurrection and wrote of Bellamy: "[He] walks cheerfully to his seat over broken homes, broken hearts, disappointed lives, dead husbands and fathers, the trampled rights of freedmen and not one word of condemnation is heard."

Bellamy served one term before being elected as a Democrat to the 56th United States Congress; he was re-elected once more, serving until 1903, and was unsuccessful in gaining a third term. Bellamy was also a delegate to the 1892, 1908, and 1920 Democratic National Conventions.

After leaving Congress, he returned to his law practice in Wilmington. Among his clients were the Seaboard Air Line Railway, the Southern Bell Telephone Co., and the Western Union Telegraph Co. In 1932, Governor Angus McLean appointed him a commissioner from North Carolina to the celebration of the two-hundredth anniversary of the birth of George Washington. Bellamy died in Wilmington in 1942.

Bellamy published Memoirs of an Octogenarian in 1942; this self-published memoir has become a valuable primary source for historians studying late nineteenth-century North Carolina history, politics, and law, and in particular the Wilmington Insurrection of 1898.

See also
Bellamy Mansion

Bibliography

References

External links

1854 births
1942 deaths
Politicians from Wilmington, North Carolina
Democratic Party North Carolina state senators
North Carolina lawyers
Democratic Party members of the United States House of Representatives from North Carolina
Wilmington insurrection of 1898
American white supremacists